Francis Lopez may refer to:

 Francis Lopez (basketball) (born 2003), Filipino basketball player
 Francis Lopez (composer) (1916–1995), French composer

See also
 Fhrancis Lopez (born 1989), Filipino model